The Women's 1 km time trial, Class B track cycling event at the 2012 Summer Paralympics took place on August 31 at London Velopark. This class is for blind and visually impaired cyclists riding with a sighted pilot.

Results
PR = Paralympic Record

References

Women's time trial B
2012 in women's road cycling